Michael Myers (born January 20, 1976) is a retired American football defensive tackle who played in the National Football League (NFL) for the Dallas Cowboys, Cleveland Browns, Denver Broncos and Cincinnati Bengals. He played college football at the University of Alabama.

Early years
Myers attended Vicksburg High School where he played both football and basketball and was an All-state selection in both sports.

He received a scholarship from the University of Mississippi, but after a low score in the ACT, he had to play two seasons at Hinds Community College in Raymond, Mississippi. As a freshman, he posted 46 tackles (14 for loss), 25 quarterback pressures, 3 passes defensed, 3 forced fumbles, 2 fumble recoveries and set a record with 20 sacks. The next year, he collected 63 tackles (16 for loss), 8 sacks, 27 quarterback pressures, 5 passes defensed, 5 forced fumbles and 3 fumble recoveries. He was twice named a junior college All-American.

Myers transferred to the University of Alabama, where as a junior he finished with 66 tackles (8 for loss), 24 quarterback pressures, 3 passes defensed, 2 fumble recoveries and 13 sacks (third on the school's all-time list). 

He was mentioned as a preseason All-American and All-SEC selection entering his senior season, but after the season opener against Vanderbilt University, where he made 5 tackles and half a sack, he was abruptly suspended for having contacted a sports agent before his eligibility was over.

Professional career

Dallas Cowboys

1998
Myers was selected by the Dallas Cowboys in the fourth round (100th overall) of the 1998 NFL Draft, after he dropped for being out of football for a year and having a poor Senior Bowl. Although he was played at defensive tackle in training camp, when the season started he was the backup defensive end behind Kavika Pittman. 

He appeared in every game and made his first start against the Washington Redskins on December 27, where he recorded a sack and became along with Greg Ellis the first pair of rookie defensive linemen to start in the same game in franchise history. He finished with 23 tackles (9 solo), 3 sacks, 5 quarterback pressures and 2 passes defensed.

1999
Myers only played in six regular season games and was declared inactive in 10 contests, tallying 11 tackles (one for loss) and 2 quarterback pressures. Because of injuries on the defensive line, he took part in the Wild Card playoff game at the Minnesota Vikings, where he had 6 tackles and 2 sacks.

2000
He was declared inactive in the first 3 games. He was given the opportunity to start the last seven games after defensive tackle Leon Lett was lost with a season ending knee injury. 

His first start at defensive tackle came against the Cincinnati Bengals on November 12. He also made a number of plays as a tight end in goal-line formations during the season. He played in 13 games (7 starts), registering 46 tackles (30 solo), 4 tackles for loss (fourth on the team), 6 quarterback pressures, 2 passes defensed, one forced fumble and one fumble recovery.

2001
Although he was seen as an undersized player at defensive tackle, he started in every game and was part of a defense that was ranked fourth in the NFL with only 287.4 yards allowed per game. He finished sixth on the team in tackles (72), tied for second in sacks (3.5) and third in quarterback pressures (18).

2002
The signing of free agent defensive tackle La'Roi Glover by the team, relegated him into a reserve role. He appeared in every game, registering 44 tackles (25 solo), 7 tackles for loss (tied for second on the team), one sack, 8 quarterback pressures, one forced fumble, one fumble recovery and 3 passes defensed.

2003
He started the season opener against the Atlanta Falcons and registered 2 tackles. He was inactive for the next 3 games, before being waived on October 7.

Cleveland Browns

2003
Myers signed with the Cleveland Browns as a free agent on November 12. He had a career day versus the Baltimore Ravens on December 21 with ten tackles and two sacks. He played in 7 games (1 start), recording 26 tackles (9 solo), 3 sacks and one pass defensed.

2004
He played in every game and made seven starts, finishing with 51 tackles (30 solo), one sack, one forced fumble and one fumble recovery.

Denver Broncos

2005
On March 30, Myers was traded by Cleveland to the Denver Broncos who also received Ebenezer Ekuban in exchange for running back Reuben Droughns. With the Broncos also signing free agent Courtney Brown, as well as obtaining Ekuban and Gerard Warren in separate trades with the Browns, the local media referred to the Broncos new defensive line as the "Browncos", since all four starters were also the Browns starters the year before, under new defensive line coach Andre Patterson. He started 15 regular season games and two playoff games including the AFC Championship game versus the Pittsburgh Steelers where he made tackles. He made 50 tackles, while helping the Broncos finish with a 13-3 record which clinched the AFC West title.

2006
Myers started all 16 games for the Broncos and had a career high 57 combined tackles (37, 20). He had 2 sacks, 2 passes defensed and forced a fumble.

Cincinnati Bengals

2007
On April 19, he signed as a free agent with the Cincinnati Bengals. After being waived on August 31, he was re-signed in the second week and finished with 34 tackles, one sack, 2 passes defensed and his first career interception against Steve McNair of the Ravens to end Baltimore's final drive and win the game. The interception deflected off the hands of Ravens tight end Todd Heap in the end zone and thwarted the Ravens' comeback attempt in the closing seconds. His contract was terminated on August 31, 2008.

Personal life
In the summer of 2012, he was a graduate assistant at Hinds Community College, coaching the defensive line while he pursued his master's degree. In February 2012, he joined other former players in a concussion lawsuit against the NFL.

References

External links
Former Browns brighten Broncos' landscape

1976 births
Living people
Sportspeople from Vicksburg, Mississippi
Players of American football from Mississippi
American football defensive ends
American football defensive tackles
Hinds Eagles football players
Alabama Crimson Tide football players
Dallas Cowboys players
Cleveland Browns players
Denver Broncos players
Cincinnati Bengals players